Aloun Ndombet-Assamba, is a Jamaican lawyer, politician and diplomat. She was formerly Member of Parliament for Saint Ann South Eastern and served as Jamaica's Minister of Tourism, Entertainment, and Culture. She has served as High Commissioner for Jamaica in London between 2012 and 2016.

Early life and education
Assamba was born in Spanish Town, St. Catherine her parents pulled up roots and went to live in Moneague, St. Ann along with her when she was a baby.  Her parents then moved to Kingston with her when she was 13 years old.  She was educated at Ferncourt High School, Merl Grove High School and the Convent of Mercy Alpha Academy, where she was deputy Head Girl. She then went on to study law at the University of the West Indies and the Norman Manley Law School. She then studied Alternative Dispute Resolution at the Capital University in Columbus, Ohio.

Career

Legal career

Assamba was legal advisor at the Jamaica Industrial Development Corporation (JIDC) between 1983 and 1987 and the Heinz Fellow in Strategic Management at the University of Pittsburgh between 1991 and 1992.

She  became a lecturer at the Mona School of Business and taught Mediation at the Norman Manley Law School.  Between 1994 and 2002, Assamba was the General manager of the City of Kingston Co-operative Credit Union (COK), from 1994 to 2002, and went on to serve as General Counsel & Chief Corporate Officer at Paymaster Jamaica Limited (2007-2008).

Political career
Aloun Ndombet-Assamba served as a Government Senator between 1998 and 2002 and then as Member of Parliament for Saint Ann South Eastern until 2007, when she was succeeded by Lisa Hanna.

Assamba served as Minister of State in the Ministry of Industry, Commerce, and Technology before becoming one of three women in the Cabinet of Jamaica as Minister of Tourism, Entertainment, and Culture.

She has been involved with many voluntary sector organisations, including the United Way of Jamaica, the Jamaica Cancer Society, the Jamaican Bar Association, and the Lions Club.

Diplomatic career

Assamba was ambassador to six European countries and was appointed as the Jamaican High Commissioner to the United Kingdom in May 2012 and served until May 2016.

Awards
 Heinz Fellowship, University of Pittsburgh
 Veuve Clicquot La Grande Dame Award

See also
 Women in the House of Representatives of Jamaica

References

Living people
Jamaican women lawyers
University of the West Indies alumni
Government ministers of Jamaica
Women government ministers of Jamaica
People's National Party (Jamaica) politicians
Members of the House of Representatives of Jamaica
Tourism ministers of Jamaica
High Commissioners of Jamaica to the United Kingdom
Jamaican women ambassadors
Year of birth missing (living people)
21st-century Jamaican women politicians
21st-century Jamaican politicians
20th-century Jamaican lawyers